Setiferotheca is a genus of fungi within the Chaetomiaceae family. This is a monotypic genus, containing the single species Setiferotheca nipponica.

References

External links 
 Setiferotheca at Index Fungorum

Dothideomycetes enigmatic taxa
Monotypic Sordariomycetes genera